Miracles in December is the second extended play by South Korean–Chinese boy band Exo. It was released by SM Entertainment on December 9, 2013. Presented as a special winter album, Miracles in December is a follow-up to the group's first studio album XOXO, which was released in June 2013. Like all of the group's music, the EP has Korean and Chinese versions. The EP is also the group's second release as well as first EP to be promoted extensively being as a combined group. Its singles were "Miracles in December" and "Christmas Day".

"Miracles in December" attracts many positive reviews and commercial success.

The Korean version was ranked number two in Gaon Singles Chart and at number three in Korea K-Pop Hot 100, as to the Mandarin version, it was ranked number nine in Baidu Weekly Music Chart and led Gaon International Singles chart.

"Miracles in December" was chosen as the title track and first single of the extended play, and along with "Christmas Day" was presented live on several local musical performances and concerts during the promotional cycle.

Background and recording

In early November 2013, Exo's management agency, SM Entertainment, announced Exo would be holding a joint concert, titled "Christmas Wonderland", with f(x) from December 24 to 25. On December 3, a 2-minute medley clip for the Korean and Mandarin-language versions of the Miracles in December EP were released. On December 4, the music videos for "Miracles in December" were unveiled on YouTube.

Released in two languages, Exo-K, Exo's Korean-language sub-group, recorded the EP's tracks in Korean while Exo-M, the Mandarin-language sub-group, performed the same songs in Mandarin. A pop ballad with classical piano accompaniment, the lead single "Miracles in December", was written by Andreas Stone Johansson and Rick Hanley. However, the song was only performed by four Exo members: Baekhyun, D.O., and Chen recorded the song in Korean, while Baekhyun, Chen, and Luhan recorded it in Mandarin. Special performances by all four (Baekhyun, D.O., Chen, and Luhan) members, with Lay miming the piano, were often performed on made-for-TV live music programs such as Inkigayo and Music Bank.

Composition and background 
"Miracles in December" according to the description of the album on the site of Korean music Naver Music is a song genre pop-ballad that uses the piano and strings in your arrangement. The song was composed and arranged by composers veterans such as Andreas Johansson Stone and Rick Hanley in collaboration with the production team of SM Entertainment. The voices in the Korean version are provided by Chen, Baekhyun and D.O., while the mandarin version belongs to the first two, and Luhan.

The song talks about a man who recalls with nostalgia the relationship with his former girlfriend and his desire to return to it, but cannot do so because of the shame and guilt. Yoon So Ra and Liu Yuan wrote the letters of the Korean and Chinese version respectively.

Release and promotion
The music videos for "Miracles in December" (one Korean, one Mandarin) were directed by Jo So-hyun, and were filmed in November in Paju, Gyeonggi-do and a studio in Ilsan, near Seoul.

On December 2, 2013 a few teasers for the Korean and Chinese version of the music video was released on official YouTube channel of SM Town, causing a lot of interest from fans. This, however, many thought that the group was promoting as a new sub-unit, which led to SM to clarify the rumors. A representative of the agency said that "it is true Baekhyun, D.O. and Chen to sing the single main... That does not mean that they are officially a sub-unit... We are planning to implement other members also to climb on stage for various performances». And continued: «We are preparing several performances because this album is a special album of winter and is full of gratitude to the fans and it is not correct to call this a new sub-unit activity.»

On December 4, 2013 both versions of the videos were announced, at 8:00pm (KST) and were released on video-sharing websites. The music video was directed by Jo Soo-hyun, and was filmed in November in Paju, Gyeonggi in a study in Ilsan.

On December 5, Exo held their debut performances from the album with "Miracles in December" on Mnet's M Countdown stage.; and the song was made available for download as digital single.

On December 9, 2013 the EP Miracles in December was released.

On December 19 The group staged the Korean version of "Christmas Day" (Simplified Chinese: 耶诞节) on M Countdown.  Performances featured all twelve members of Exo with accompanying choreography produced by Tony Testa and Greg Hwang.

The EP finished at numbers 1 and 2 both weekly and monthly on the Gaon Albums Chart, for the Korean and Mandarin versions, respectively.  The "Miracles in December" single (Korean version) reached number 2 on Gaon's Weekly Digital Singles Chart and number 3 on Billboard's Korea K-Pop Hot 100.  The Mandarin version of the song was number 47 on the Gaon chart, but topped the Gaon International Singles Chart. It also went to number 7 on China's Baidu charts.  "Christmas Day"'s Korean edition reached number 5 and 38 on the Gaon and K-Pop Hot 100 weekly charts, respectively, and the Mandarin edition reached number 10 on Baidu's charts.

Live performances 
In December, Exo began their promotions running Korean version live on several local music programs, including M Countdown 5, Music Bank 6, Show! Music Core 7 and Inkigayo 8. In the following week's promotions, SM informed that Luhan and Lay also participate in presentations, as well as promised the fans. Baekhyun, Chen and D.O. appeared on the stage of SBS MTV's The Show on December 17, 2013 and Show Champion on December 18, 2013. The song was also included in the set-list of the winter festival of the group with his classmates seal f(x) SM Town Week: Christmas Wonderland on 23 and 24 December 2013. The Chinese version of "Miracles in December" was acted in the MTV The Show on December 24, 2013 with D.O., Luhan, Baekhyun, Chen and Lay members.

Critical reception 
K-pop critic "Seoulbeats" gave a positive review of the song saying that "[it's] really worth all the hype that it's receiving." Analysis indicated that "Miracles in December" just grows and grows throughout its duration and commended the harmonization as "a thing of beauty".

Track listing
Credits adapted from Naver.

Charts
Korean and Chinese versions

Combined version

Awards and nominations

Sales and shipments

Album sales

Release history

References

2013 EPs
SM Entertainment EPs
Genie Music EPs
Korean-language EPs
Chinese-language EPs
Mandopop EPs
Exo EPs
Christmas albums by South Korean artists
2013 singles
SM Entertainment singles
Korean songs
Korean-language songs
Chinese songs
Mandarin-language songs